Theta Lyrae (θ Lyr) is a star in a trinary star system, in the constellation Lyra, approximately 770 light years away from Earth. Theta Lyrae is an orange bright giant star of the spectral type K0II, which means that it possesses a surface temperature of about 5,000 kelvins, and is many times bigger and brighter, yet cooler, than the Sun.

It is orbited by a subsystem composed of BD+37° 3399 and BD+37° 3399B. 10th magnitude BD+37° 3399 is a giant star with a spectral type of K2III. It is therefore almost the same temperature as Theta Lyrae, but smaller and dimmer. BD+37° 3399B is an 11th magnitude star of an unknown spectral type.

References

Lyra (constellation)
Lyrae, Theta
Lyrae, 21
094713
180809
7314
BD+37 3398
Triple star systems
K-type bright giants
K-type giants